Criorhina bubulcus'is a species of syrphid fly in the family Syrphidae.

Distribution
Canada, United States.

References

Eristalinae
Insects described in 1849
Diptera of North America
Hoverflies of North America
Taxa named by Francis Walker (entomologist)